In Greek mythology, Glaucus was a Greek prophetic sea-god, born mortal and turned immortal upon eating a magical herb. It was believed that he came to the rescue of sailors and fishermen in storms, having earlier earned a living from the sea himself.

Family
Glaucus's parentage is different in the different traditions: (i) Nereus; (ii) Copeus; (iii) Polybus, son of Hermes, and Euboea, daughter of Larymnus; (iv) Anthedon and Alcyone; or Poseidon and the nymph Naïs.

Mythology

Origin 
The story of Glaucus's apotheosis was dealt with in detail by Ovid in Metamorphoses and briefly referenced by many other authors. According to Ovid, Glaucus began his life as a mortal fisherman living in the Boeotian city of Anthedon. He found a magical herb which could bring the fish he caught back to life, and decided to try eating it. The herb made him immortal, but also caused him to grow fins instead of arms and a fish's tail instead of legs (though some versions say he simply became a merman-like being), forcing him to dwell forever in the sea. Glaucus was initially upset by this side-effect, but Oceanus and Tethys received him well and he was quickly accepted among the deities of the sea, learning from them the art of prophecy.

John Tzetzes adds to the above story that Glaucus became "immortal, but not immune to aging".

In an alternate, non-extant version cited in Athenaeus (with reference to Nicander's Aetolian History), Glaucus chased a hare on Mount Oreia until the animal fell down almost dead, then carried his prey to a spring and rubbed it with a bunch of grass that was growing about. The herb brought the hare back to life. Glaucus then tasted it himself and fell into a state of "divine madness", in which state Zeus made him fling himself into the stormy sea.

Athenaeus also informs that in yet another version followed by Possis of Magnesia, Glaucus (rather than Argus) was the builder and the pilot of Argo. During a naval battle between the Argonauts and the Etruscans, he fell into the sea and by the will of Zeus became a sea god.

The herb
Alexander of Aetolia, cited in Athenaeus, related that the magical herb grew on the island Thrinacia sacred to Helios and served as a remedy against fatigue for the sun god's horses. Aeschrion of Samos informed that it was known as the "dog's-tooth" and was believed to have been sown by Cronus.

Prophetic abilities
Athenaeus, referring to Aristotle's non-extant Constitution of Delos, related that Glaucus settled in Delos together with the Nereids and would give prophecies to whoever asked for them. He also mentions, this time with reference to Nicander, that Apollo was believed to have learned the art of prophecy from Glaucus.

Advisor to seafarers
An encounter of Glaucus with the Argonauts was described by Diodorus Siculus and Philostratus the Elder. When the Argonauts were caught in a storm, Orpheus addressed the Cabeiroi with prayer; the wind ceased, and Glaucus appeared. He followed the Argo for two days and prophesied to Heracles and the Dioscuri their future adventures and eventual deification. He addressed other members of the crew individually as well, especially noting that he was sent to them thanks to Orpheus's prayer, and instructing them to further pray to the Cabeiroi. In Apollonius Rhodius's version, Glaucus appeared at the point when Telamon quarreled with Jason over Heracles and Polyphemus being left behind on the coast of Bithynia where Hylas had been lost. Glaucus reconciled the two by letting them know that it had been ordained for Heracles to return to Eurystheus's court and complete his Twelve Labours, and for Polyphemus to found Cius, while Hylas had been abducted by a nymph and married her. Cf. also above for the version that made Glaucus an Argonaut himself.

In Euripides's play Orestes, Glaucus appeared in front of Menelaus on the latter's voyage home, announcing to him the death of his brother Agamemnon by the hand of Clytaemnestra.

Love life
According to Ovid and Hyginus, Glaucus fell in love with the beautiful nymph Scylla and wanted her for his wife, but she was appalled by his fish-like features and fled onto land when he tried to approach her. He asked the witch Circe for a potion to make Scylla fall in love with him, but Circe fell in love with him instead. She tried to win his heart with her most passionate and loving words, telling him to scorn Scylla and stay with her. But he replied that trees would grow on the ocean floor and seaweed would grow on the highest mountain before he would stop loving Scylla. In her anger, Circe poisoned the pool where Scylla bathed, transforming her into a terrible monster with twelve feet and six heads.

Euanthes and Theolytus of Methymna also recorded an affair between Glaucus and Ariadne: according to Athenaeus who cites these authors, Glaucus seduced Ariadne as she was abandoned by Theseus on Dia (Naxos). Dionysus then fought Glaucus over Ariadne and overpowered him, binding his hands and feet with grape vines; he, however, released Glaucus when the latter disclosed his own name and origin.

According to Mnaseas, again cited in Athenaeus, Glaucus abducted Syme on a journey back from Asia, and had the island Syme named after her; according to Aeschrion of Samos, Glaucus was the lover of the semi-historical Hydne.

Glaucus was reported to have had male lovers as well: Nicander in Europia mentioned Nereus as one, while Hedylus of Samos (or Athens) wrote that it was out of love for Melicertes that Glaucus threw himself into the sea. Yet according to Nicanor of Cyrene's Change of Names, Glaucus and the deified Melicertes were one and the same.

It is not known if Glaucus had any children, but Pausanias mentions Glaucus of Carystus as an alleged descendant of Glaucus the sea god. Virgil seems to indicate the Cumaean Sibyl, Deiphobe, as a daughter of Glaucus.

Cultural depictions
 Aeschylus wrote a play on Glaucus, entitled Glaucus Pontius ("Glaucus of the Sea"), now lost. A work entitled Glaucus also belonged to Callimachus (it is unclear though which Glaucus was its subject).
 The Roman author Velleius Paterculus made mention of Plancus, who performed in the role of Glaucus at a feast.
 Scylla et Glaucus, an opera by Jean-Marie Leclair, was based on the myth of Glaucus's love for Scylla recorded in Ovid.
 In Book 3 of "Endymion" by John Keats the story of Glaucus and Circe is retold.
 A statue of Glaucus was installed in 1911 in the middle of the Fontana delle Naiadi, Mario Rutelli's fountain of four naked bronze nymphs, located in the Piazza Repubblica, Rome.
 Ezra Pound wrote a poem titled "An Idyl for Glaucus" from the perspective of Glaucus's human lover, abandoned after he had tasted the herb and leapt into the sea.

Notes

References 

 Apollonius Rhodius, Argonautica translated by Robert Cooper Seaton (1853-1915), R. C. Loeb Classical Library Volume 001. London, William Heinemann Ltd, 1912. Online version at the Topos Text Project.
 Apollonius Rhodius, Argonautica. George W. Mooney. London. Longmans, Green. 1912. Greek text available at the Perseus Digital Library.
 Athenaeus of Naucratis, The Deipnosophists or Banquet of the Learned. London. Henry G. Bohn, York Street, Covent Garden. 1854. Online version at the Perseus Digital Library.
 Athenaeus of Naucratis, Deipnosophistae. Kaibel. In Aedibus B.G. Teubneri. Lipsiae. 1887. Greek text available at the Perseus Digital Library.
 Diodorus Siculus, The Library of History translated by Charles Henry Oldfather. Twelve volumes. Loeb Classical Library. Cambridge, Massachusetts: Harvard University Press; London: William Heinemann, Ltd. 1989. Vol. 3. Books 4.59–8. Online version at Bill Thayer's Web Site
 Diodorus Siculus, Bibliotheca Historica. Vol 1-2. Immanel Bekker. Ludwig Dindorf. Friedrich Vogel. in aedibus B. G. Teubneri. Leipzig. 1888-1890. Greek text available at the Perseus Digital Library.
 Euripides, The Complete Greek Drama, edited by Whitney J. Oates and Eugene O'Neill Jr. in two volumes. 2. Orestes, translated by Robert Potter. New York. Random House. 1938. Online version at the Perseus Digital Library.
 Euripides, Euripidis Fabulae. vol. 3. Gilbert Murray. Oxford. Clarendon Press, Oxford. 1913. Greek text available at the Perseus Digital Library.
 Gaius Julius Hyginus, Fabulae from The Myths of Hyginus translated and edited by Mary Grant. University of Kansas Publications in Humanistic Studies. Online version at the Topos Text Project.
 Maurus Servius Honoratus, In Vergilii carmina comentarii. Servii Grammatici qui feruntur in Vergilii carmina commentarii; recensuerunt Georgius Thilo et Hermannus Hagen. Georgius Thilo. Leipzig. B. G. Teubner. 1881. Online version at the Perseus Digital Library.
 Nonnus of Panopolis, Dionysiaca translated by William Henry Denham Rouse (1863-1950), from the Loeb Classical Library, Cambridge, MA, Harvard University Press, 1940.  Online version at the Topos Text Project.
 Nonnus of Panopolis, Dionysiaca. 3 Vols. W.H.D. Rouse. Cambridge, MA., Harvard University Press; London, William Heinemann, Ltd. 1940-1942. Greek text available at the Perseus Digital Library.
 Pausanias, Description of Greece with an English Translation by W.H.S. Jones, Litt.D., and H.A. Ormerod, M.A., in 4 Volumes. Cambridge, MA, Harvard University Press; London, William Heinemann Ltd. 1918. Online version at the Perseus Digital Library
 Pausanias, Graeciae Descriptio. 3 vols. Leipzig, Teubner. 1903.  Greek text available at the Perseus Digital Library.
 Philostratus the Elder. Imagines, translated by Arthur Fairbanks (1864-1944). Loeb Classical Library Volume 256. London: William Heinemann, 1931. Online version at the Topos Text Project.
 Philostratus the Lemnian (Philostratus Major), Flavii Philostrati Opera. Vol 2. Carl Ludwig Kayser. in aedibus B. G. Teubneri. Lipsiae. 1871. Greek text available at the Perseus Digital Library.
 Publius Ovidius Naso, Metamorphoses translated by Brookes More (1859-1942). Boston, Cornhill Publishing Co. 1922. Online version at the Perseus Digital Library.
 Publius Ovidius Naso, Metamorphoses. Hugo Magnus. Gotha (Germany). Friedr. Andr. Perthes. 1892. Latin text available at the Perseus Digital Library.
 Publius Ovidius Naso, The Epistles of Ovid. London. J. Nunn, Great-Queen-Street; R. Priestly, 143, High-Holborn; R. Lea, Greek-Street, Soho; and J. Rodwell, New-Bond-Street. 1813. Online version at the Perseus Digital Library.
 Publius Papinius Statius, The Thebaid translated by John Henry Mozley. Loeb Classical Library Volumes. Cambridge, MA, Harvard University Press; London, William Heinemann Ltd. 1928. Online version at the Topos Text Project.
 Publius Papinius Statius, The Thebaid. Vol I-II. John Henry Mozley. London: William Heinemann; New York: G.P. Putnam's Sons. 1928. Latin text available at the Perseus Digital Library.
 Publius Vergilius Maro, Aeneid. Theodore C. Williams. trans. Boston. Houghton Mifflin Co. 1910. Online version at the Perseus Digital Library.
 Publius Vergilius Maro, Bucolics, Aeneid, and Georgics. J. B. Greenough. Boston. Ginn & Co. 1900. Latin text available at the Perseus Digital Library.
 Smith, William (ed.) Dictionary of Greek and Roman Biography and Mythology. Vol. II. London, 1867. - p. 275

Greek sea gods
Metamorphoses characters
Argonauts
Piscine and amphibian humanoids
Fictional fishers
Mermen